The Rabbit Islands are a group of three uninhabited small islands off the north coast of Sutherland, Scotland in Tongue Bay. In Scottish Gaelic, and occasionally in English, they are known as Eileanan nan Gall, which is sometimes anglicised as "Eilean-na-Gaeil"  or "Eilean nan Gaill".

Geography and geology
The islands' modern name derives from their sandy soil, which favours rabbit burrows and makes their presence particularly obvious . They are fairly low lying, slender in shape, and along with the surrounding fjard of Tongue Bay, they show the effects of former glaciation. They are made up of sandstone.

The northernmost of the group is called Sgeir an Òir, and there is a natural arch at its north end called "Claigeann na Sgeir" (Bell of the Skerry).

They are near Coldbackie, Melness and Talmine on the mainland, and Eilean nan Ròn is to the north east. They are in the parish of Tongue.

History
The islands' older name "Eileanan nan Gall", means "islands of the strangers", or "Norsemen".

Supposedly, a ship carrying gold to Charles Edward Stuart was wrecked on the island. The northernmost of the group is called Sgeir an Òir (skerry of the gold), which is perhaps a reference to this.

The islands are popular with scuba divers, and have in the past been used for grazing.

See also

 List of islands of Scotland
 List of outlying islands of Scotland

References

Islands of Sutherland
Sites of Special Scientific Interest in North West Sutherland
Uninhabited islands of Highland (council area)
Natural arches of Scotland
Archipelagoes of Scotland